Ryan Jones (born 1981) is a Welsh rugby union player.

Ryan Jones may also refer to:

Ryan Jones (footballer, born 1973), Welsh footballer
Ryan Jones (footballer, born 1992), English football goalkeeper
Ryan Jones (footballer, born 2002), English footballer
Ryan Jones (ice hockey) (born 1984), Canadian ice hockey forward
Nick Jones (basketball) (Ryan Nicholas Jones, born 1945), American basketball player